Wild-type transthyretin amyloid (WTTA), also known as senile systemic amyloidosis (SSA), is a disease that typically affects the heart and tendons of elderly people. It is caused by accumulation of a wild-type (that is to say a normal) protein called transthyretin. This is in contrast to a related condition called transthyretin-related hereditary amyloidosis where a genetically mutated transthyretin protein tends to deposit at a much earlier age than in WTTA, due to abnormal conformation and bioprocessing. 
It belongs to a group of diseases called amyloidosis, chronic progressive conditions linked to abnormal deposition of normal or abnormal proteins, because these proteins are misshapen and cannot be properly degraded and eliminated by the cell metabolism.

Signs and symptoms
Wild-type transthyretin amyloid accumulates mainly in the heart, where it causes stiffness and often thickening of its walls, leading consequently to shortness of breath and intolerance to exercise, called diastolic dysfunction. Excessively slow heart rate can also occur, such as in sick sinus syndrome, with ensuing fatigue and dizziness.  Wild-type transthyretin deposition is also a common cause of carpal tunnel syndrome in elderly men, which may cause pain, tingling and loss of sensation in the hands. Some patients may develop carpal tunnel syndrome as an initial symptom of wild-type transthyretin amyloid.
There appears to be an increase in the risk for developing hematuria or blood in the urine due to urological lesions.

Natural course

The disorder typically affects the heart and its prevalence increases in older age groups. Men are affected much more frequently than women, and up to 25% of men over the age of 80 may have evidence of WTTA.

Patients often present with increased thickness of the wall of the main heart chamber, the left ventricle. People affected by WTT amyloidosis are likely to have required a pacemaker before diagnosis and have a high incidence of a partial electrical blockage of the heart, known as left bundle branch block. Low ECG signals such as QRS complexes are widely considered a marker of cardiac amyloidosis.

A much better survival has been reported for patients with WTTA as opposed to cardiac AL amyloidosis.

Diagnosis
The condition is suspected in an elderly person, especially male, presenting with symptoms of heart failure such as shortness of breath or swollen legs, and or disease of the electrical system of the heart with ensuing slow heart rate, dizziness or fainting spells. The diagnosis is confirmed on the basis of a biopsy, which can be treated with a special stain called Congo Red that will be positive in this condition, and immunohistochemistry. However, this disease can now non-invasively be diagnosed with the help of Tc-99m pyrophosphate scintigraphy.

Treatment
No drug has been shown to be able to arrest or slow down the process of this condition. There is promise that two drugs, tafamidis and diflunisal, may improve the outlook, since they were demonstrated in randomized clinical trials to benefit patient affected by the related condition FAP-1 otherwise known as transthyretin-related hereditary amyloidosis.  Permanent pacing can be employed in cases of symptomatic slow heart rate (bradycardia). Heart failure medications can be used to treat symptoms of difficulty breathing and congestion.

An investigational first-in-human study has demonstrated that NTLA-2001, a therapeutic agent based on the CRISPR-Cas9 system, induces targeted knockout of the transthyretin protein.

Orphan drug status for transthyretin (TTR) amyloidosis
Because of preliminary data suggesting the drug may have activity, the U.S. FDA has granted tolcapone "orphan drug status" in studies aiming at the treatment of transthyretin familial amyloidosis (ATTR). However, tolcapone is not FDA approved for the treatment of this disease.

See also 
 Transthyretin-related hereditary amyloidosis
 Amyloidosis

References

External links 
 The Amyloidosis Center at Boston University
 Mayo Clinic Definition
 A Patient Guide to Amyloidosis

Amyloidosis
Histopathology
Structural proteins